Zor-El is a fictional character appearing in American comic books published by DC Comics. A Kryptonian, he is the brother of Jor-El, husband of Alura, father of Supergirl, and paternal uncle of Superman.

Traditional depictions of Zor-El in Golden Age and Silver Age DC Comics stories portrayed him as a benevolent scientist concerned for his daughter Kara, acting similarly to his brother Jor-El in sending his child to safety on Earth. In the mid-2000s, DC experimented with different characterisations of Zor-El, even briefly casting him as a mad scientist with a grudge against his brother. A similar depiction was used when the character was adapted for television in the series Smallville. In 2010s stories following DC's The New 52 reboot, Zor-El has been an antagonist for Supergirl and Superman, having been transformed into the villain Cyborg Superman by Brainiac.

Zor-El was portrayed by Simon Ward in the film Supergirl. Christopher Heyerdahl portrayed a villainous version in the TV series Smallville. Robert Gant portrayed the character in the Arrowverse television series Supergirl in the first two seasons, and Jason Behr portrayed him in the sixth season.

Publication history
Zor-El first appeared in Action Comics #252 (May 1959) and was created by Otto Binder and Al Plastino.

Fictional character biography

Pre-Crisis

Earth-One

In pre-Crisis continuity, Zor-El was a climatographer on Krypton, and one of the only scientists to believe his brother Jor-El's predictions about the impending destruction of Krypton. When the planet exploded, Argo City was somehow blown safely into space with a life-giving bubble of air around it (a later version of the story in Action Comics #316 (September 1964) has the city saved by weather dome that Zor-El had constructed). The explosion had turned the ground beneath Argo City into Kryptonite, but Zor-El and the other survivors covered the surface with sheets of lead. The Kryptonians managed to keep alive for many years, and Kara was born a short time after the destruction of Krypton. The end for Argo City came when a meteor storm punched holes into the lead sheeting, exposing the survivors to the deadly kryptonite radiation. Zor-El managed to build a rocket and use it to send his daughter Kara to Earth. Fearing that Superman would not recognize her because he had left Krypton as an infant, Kara's parents provided a costume based closely on the Man of Steel's own.

It was later revealed to Supergirl through Zor-El induced dreams that her parents had teleported away into the Survival Zone (similar to the Phantom Zone) during Argo's final moments. Supergirl was able to rescue them in Action Comics #310 (March 1964), and Zor-El and Alura went on to live in Kandor. When the bottle city was enlarged, Zor-El and Alura resettled on New Krypton/Rokyn.

Earth-Two
In the alternate universe of Earth-Two, Zor-L and Allura (note different spelling) sent Kara to Earth Two where she became Power Girl. This Zor-L was an expert in psychology and created a virtual reality chamber for Kara inside her spacecraft. As she aged inside the rocket on her way to Earth-Two (taking a different, longer course than Kal-L did), she experienced the type of life she would have had on Krypton. Zor-L and Allura were killed when Krypton exploded. This version of Zor-L lived in Kandor and not Argo City. Zor-L only made one appearance in Showcase #98 (March 1978).

Post-Crisis and Zero Hour (Birthright) and Infinite Crisis timelines 

In "The Supergirl from Krypton" story-arc in Superman/Batman #8-13 (May–October 2004), Zor-El rocketed his daughter away from Krypton before Kal-El left. It was expected that she would reach Earth first and could help raise Kal from his infancy. However, she stayed in stasis and her ship did not reach Earth until years later, so the infant she expected to help raise was a grown man when she arrived still in her teens.

After Lex Luthor uses Black Kryptonite to split Kara into good and evil parts, the evil Kara claims that Zor-El actually sent his daughter to Earth to kill his nephew, since he was resentful of his older brother and hated the idea of Jor-El's lineage continuing past Krypton's destruction. Regardless of the truth or falseness of this, Kara has rejected this aspect of herself.

In the new Supergirl series, new information on Zor-El's history and relations are crucial with Zor-El was featured in issue #16 as he appeared as an apparition and explained what truly happened to Kara, and why she was sent to Earth to kill Kal-El, in a dream sequence. Zor-El was against the use of the Phantom Zone as a prison because he felt that it would become abused, since no blood was shed, it became a clean way to deal with criminals. In the Argo City area he lived in he was a very trusted scientist, like his brother Jor-El, and was working at this time on Sunstones (Krypton's crystalline technology). He fought with Jor-El over the use of the Phantom Zone and tried to stop him from supporting it. Zor-El began to see that each time someone went in, something was also coming out, in the form of Phantoms. These Phantoms possessed people, creating anarchy on Krypton. Zor-El discovered he could stop them using his Sunstones, although the bodies of the possessed would be destroyed. However, Zor-El was not believed and began to be seen as a dangerous crank.

This tied together and explained fragmented flashbacks that had suggested Zor-El was a villainous character, including his dismissal of schoolchildren taunting Kara as "the dead" (they had already been possessed) and Alura telling Kara to kill her and "make your father proud" (she had also been possessed, and this was not a taunt but a genuine request from what remained of her original personality) as well as the original idea that he wanted Kara to kill Kal-El. As the story ended, it was revealed that the House of El was cursed by the Phantoms as they saw them as their jailers. Wherever one of the El blood line went, the Phantoms would follow. To save Earth, he needed to send Kara to remove Kal and stop the El blood line from ever-growing.

At the end of this story arc, however, it was revealed that the images of Zor-El and the Phantoms subsequently invading Earth as predicted were all a ruse by the Monitors to see if Supergirl belonged in the New Earth universe. Upon discovering she was truly that universe's Supergirl she was left to her own devices to reconcile with all the people she harmed in the wake of the "test". The Monitor does, however, assert that the memories of Zor-El and the phantoms on Krypton were nevertheless real.

New Krypton
A subsequent flashback in #24 apparently contradicts the Monitor, revealing that "New Earth" Zor-El was not a scientist, although Alura was. In current continuity, Zor-El was a Ranger, and got on well with his brother. With his encouragement, Alura designed the ship that sent Kara to Earth, as both Kal-El's protector and the last living being who remembered Krypton (since Kal-El was an infant). Nothing further has been revealed about the real New Earth Zor-El, as yet.

In Action Comics #869 it is revealed the Zor-El saved Argo City from Krypton's destruction by engineering a protective dome with his wife Alura. However, Brainiac, who was the culprit for Krypton's explosion, returned to finish the job. He merged Argo with the Bottle City of Kandor and killed those he considered to be duplicate information. Superman finds the city in Brainiac's ship. Zor-El and Alura are able to make contact with Kal-El to enquire about their daughter. He was later murdered by Reactron.  In Supergirl (vol. 5) #43, Zor-El is described as a noted member of Krypton's Artist Guild, and Kara as sharing his creative impulse.

In Blackest Night crossover, while Kara and Alura are visiting Zor-El's tomb, discussing the situation with Earth, Zor-El is reanimated as a member of the Black Lantern Corps, ready to attack his wife and daughter. The scientists of New Krypton manage to place a forcefield composed of a counter-energy to the black ring's power source around the planet, cutting off Zor-El's right hand and preventing him from continuing his attack.

The New 52
In September 2011, The New 52 rebooted DC's continuity. In this new timeline, Supergirl discovers an amnesiac Cyborg Superman living on the planet I'noxia. This turns out to be Zor-El, who was rescued from Krypton's destruction by Brainiac and reconfigured as a half-man half-machine to be his scout looking for stronger species in the universe. 

His backstory is that in spite of his jealousy and resentment, Zor-El listened when Jor-El claimed Krypton was doomed. Using Brainiac-based technology he built a dome around Argo City, and a space rocket to send Kara to Earth just in case Argo's force-field failed. He did not warn his wife and daughter about his plans, though. Minutes before the explosion he put his daughter to sleep, laid her on a space pod and blasted her into space, an action for which his wife nonfatally shot him before realizing that he was correct about the fate of Krypton. Argo City outlived Krypton but not for long. Without a way to sustain themselves, the cities seven million inhabitants died off. Zor-El sent a distress signal, but less than a dozen people remained alive when Brainiac found the city. Brainiac turned Zor-El into a cyborg, erased his memory and reprogrammed him to serve him. 

Still Zor-El was not a compliant servant. He was obsessed with achieving perfection and getting his lost memories back. The new Zor-El met and fought Supergirl -who gave him the "Cyborg Superman" moniker- several times.  
Zor-El eventually rebelled against Brainiac. He was soundly defeated and left for dead. Still his systems rebooted, restoring his memory in the process. Zor-El was appalled at what he had become and what he had done and became obsessed with bringing Argo City back and recreating Krypton, convincing himself it was for his daughter's sake. 

Unfortunately, his chosen method demanded the sacrifice of Earth people's lives, forcing Supergirl to stop him. After defeating him, Kara told her father he could have looked for another way to save Argo and she would have helped him but he never wanted that. Still she was not willing to give up on her father. So Zor-El was taken to Dr. Veritas's lab, and was placed inside a pod as Dr. Veritas went about removing his cybernetic components and reconstructing his body using TychoTech's technology. His daughter still visited him, unwilling to give up on her father, but Zor-El pretended to sleep and never talked back. 

It was not until Indigo nearly killed Supergirl that he acted by tearing Indigo into pieces. Although he was only saving his daughter's life, the National City's townsfolk felt his actions confirmed Supergirl was protecting a murderer only because he was her father. Zor-El was captured by the D.E.O., taken to a clandestine base and locked up. There he was visited by Mister Oz, who gave him what he considered a mercy kill by activating the red plasma failsafe in his containment tank, leaving him to drown in it, powerless.

Powers and abilities
Zor-El has all the powers and weaknesses of a Kryptonian from exposure to Earth's yellow sunlight. After Brainiac revived him as a cyborg, he became stronger, faster, and more powerful than ever. He has the ability to project blasts of energy from his cybernetic eye or body. His right arm can shapeshift into any weapon he imagines, but only for conceivable limits. The Earth-One version possesses expertise in climatology.

In other media

Television
 Zor-El appears alongside his wife Alura in the Super Friends episode "The Krypton Syndrome".
 Zor-El first appeared in the seventh-season episode of Smallville, "Lara". A replicant of Zor-El (portrayed by Christopher Heyerdahl), and his sister in-law Lara (portrayed by former Supergirl actor Helen Slater) returned in "Blue" due to a crystal technology developed by Zor-El that can preserve Kryptonian clones. In the Smallville mythology, Zor-El and Jor-El were bitter rivals who refused to speak, specifically due to the actions of Zor-El. The recorded mind of Jor-El, confronted by his son Clark Kent in "Kara", reveals that Zor-El was a corrupt and evil branch of the "El" line and there was no reason for Clark to know that he was a relative of such a person, very different from the one in the comics. In the episode, it's revealed that Zor-El loved Lara and that he despised Jor-El because he believed he stole her away from him. Zor-El appeared in the 8th episode of the 7th season "Blue" as a replicant, created by a few strands left in crystal technology, when he tricked Clark in to setting a blue crystal sent with Kara into the Fortress of Solitude. It has been recently revealed in Smallville Legends: "Kara From Krypton" that Zor-El worked for Zod, yet in the 15th episode of the 7th Season "Veritas", Kara says that the only thing their fathers did agree on was their "mutual hatred for General Zod".
 As a spinoff from the Smallville show, a series of animated shorts were produced called Kara and the Chronicles of Krypton. Originally streamed on the CW website and sent to the phones of Sprint customers, Kara and the Chronicles of Krypton showed the last day of Krypton. Zor-El is a miner in Kandor who is in league with Zod. He believes he is the subject of one of Rao's prophecies and that he will create a New Krypton on Earth where he would live as a god. Kara finds out about his scheme to destroy the planet and alerts Lara who thanks her for the warning that will lead to Kal-El's escape. In Kara's fight to escape him, Zor-El is impaled on a crystal. He erases his daughter's memory of the incident and prepares the blue crystal in time to send Kara on her way to Earth.
 Zor-El appears in the Supergirl TV series, portrayed by Robert Gant in season one and season two and by Jason Behr in season six. In the pilot episode, he is briefly seen sending Kara on a rocket off of Krypton before it explodes. In "For the Girl Who Has Everything", Zor-El is briefly seen in a hologram. In "Medusa", it is revealed that he created Medusa virus which is not harmful to Kryptonians but lethal to other alien species in the case of potential invasion, but it was never used on Krypton after its creation. In later seasons, Zor-El is merely mentioned and is revealed to have died after having saved Argo City from Krypton's destruction. Due to their new unfamiliar surrounding, majority of Argo City's inhabitants grew weak and were dying. Zor- El was able to use the rock of Eudical to make Argo City inhabitable, but died in the process. His lab remains where Kara, Mon-El, and Alura were able to use and finish his trans map portal taking them back to Earth. In season six episode "A Few Good Women" after the "Crisis on Infinite Earths", it was revealed that Zor-El avoided Krypton's destruction by projecting himself into the Phantom Zone in this new timeline/Multiverse. At the time when she was sent into the Phantom Zone, Zor-El reunites with her and keeps her safe from the Phantom Zone Phantoms. They work on a way to get out of the Phantom Zone which involves them having to catch a Phantom Zone Phantom. When the Super Friends enter the Phantom Zone in the Tower and use a sun bomb, Supergirl flies Zor-El to the Tower as it leaves the Phantom Zone.

Film
 Zor-El appears in the 1984 Supergirl movie, portrayed by Simon Ward.
 Zor-El appears in Superman/Batman: Apocalypse during a opening flashback of Kara escaping Krypton.
 Zor-El appears in Superman: Unbound voiced by Stephen Root. This version is still alive and living in Kandor. Superman visits Kandor, Zor-El and Alura tell him about Brainiac.
 Zor-El appears in DC Super Hero Girls: Hero of the Year, voiced by Tom Kenny.

Novels
 The Zor-El of Kevin J. Anderson's novel, The Last Days of Krypton, is one of Krypton’s most accomplished scientists, second only to his older brother Jor-El. Zor-El is also the political leader of Argo City, a coastal metropolis on a narrow tropical peninsula off the main continent’s southeastern shore. While investigating tremors originating in Krypton’s uninhabited southern continent, Zor-El discovers a new volcano, an indication of rising core pressure that could lead to the planet’s doom. After the theft of Kandor by Brainiac, Jor-El is able to convince Commissioner Zod to sanction the construction of the Rao beam, which Jor-El and Zor-El use to relieve the pressure at the core. When Zor-El discovers that Zod is consolidating power by kidnapping his most vocal opponents, he leads the cities of Krypton in a coordinated revolt against the dictator. Knowing that Zod plans to lay siege to Argo City, Zor-El commissions the construction of shield generators around the city’s perimeter. These shields are later used to save the city from the destruction of Krypton (though Anderson does not reveal whether Zor-El’s plan to save Argo City is ultimately successful).

References

Characters created by Otto Binder
Comics characters introduced in 1959
Cyborg superheroes
Cyborg supervillains
DC Comics characters who can move at superhuman speeds
DC Comics characters with superhuman senses
DC Comics characters with superhuman strength
DC Comics cyborgs
DC Comics extraterrestrial superheroes
DC Comics extraterrestrial supervillains
DC Comics male superheroes
DC Comics male supervillains
DC Comics police officers
DC Comics scientists
Fictional characters with absorption or parasitic abilities
Fictional characters with air or wind abilities
Fictional characters with energy-manipulation abilities
Fictional characters with fire or heat abilities
Fictional characters with ice or cold abilities
Fictional characters with nuclear or radiation abilities
Fictional characters with superhuman durability or invulnerability
Fictional characters with X-ray vision
Fictional extraterrestrial cyborgs
Superhero film characters
Kryptonians
Superman characters